Maurice Cardin (July 19, 1909 – March 23, 2009) was an American politician who served in the Maryland House of Delegates from Baltimore City's 5th district from 1951 to 1966. His nephew is current Maryland U.S. Senator Ben Cardin, who took over his seat in the Maryland House of Delegates when he retired from politics.

He died of heart failure on March 23, 2009, in Lake Worth, Florida at age 99.

References

1909 births
2009 deaths
Democratic Party members of the Maryland House of Delegates
People from Lake Worth Beach, Florida
People from Baltimore
20th-century American politicians
Cardin family